Following is a list of notable architects from the country of Uruguay.

A
 Luis Andreoni (1853–1936) Italian; worked in Montevideo
 Mariano Arana (born 1933) mayor of Montevideo (1995-2005), Minister of Housing (2005-2008)
 Leopoldo Artucio (1903–1976)
 Juan María Aubriot (1876–1930)

B
 Alfredo Baldomir (1884–1938) President of the Republic (1938-1942)
 Francisco Beltrame (born 1952) Minister of Housing since 2012

C
 Joseph Carré (1870-1941) French; worked in Uruguay 
 Antoni Bonet i Castellana (1913–1989) Catalan; worked in Uruguay
 Mauricio Cravotto (1893–1962)

D
 Eladio Dieste (1917–2000)

F
 Román Fresnedo Siri (1903–1975)

G
 Camille Gardelle (1866–1947) Catalan; worked in Uruguay
 Juan Giuria (1880–1957)

L
 César Loustau  (1926–2011)
 Aurelio Lucchini (died 1989)

M
 Jorge Majfud (born 1969)
 Vittorio Meano (1860–1904) Italian; worked in Montevideo
 Graciela Muslera (born 1963) first female Minister of Housing in Uruguay

O
 Carlos Ott (born 1946)

P
 Mario Palanti (1885–1978) Italian; worked in Montevideo

R
 Víctor Rabú (1834–1907) French; worked in Uruguay

S
 Juan Antonio Scasso (1892–1973)
 Gustavo Scheps (born 1954)

T
 Horacio Terra Arocena (1894–1985)
 Juan Pablo Terra (1924–1991)

V
 Héctor Vigliecca (born 1940)
 Julio Vilamajó (1894–1948)
 Rafael Viñoly (born 1944)

Z
 Carlo Zucchi (1789–1849) Italian; worked in Uruguay

See also

 Culture of Uruguay
 List of architects
 List of Uruguayans

References

Uruguayan
Architect